Walter Patrick Bexigas Ramos Lopes (born 10 August 1992 in Lisbon) is a Portuguese footballer who most recently played for FC Hradec Králové as a forward.

Football career
On 10 May 2015, Walter Patrick made his professional debut with Oliveirense in a 2014–15 Segunda Liga match against Farense.

References

External links
Stats and profile at Zerozero

Stats and profile at LPFP 

1992 births
Living people
Footballers from Lisbon
Portuguese footballers
Association football midfielders
Liga Portugal 2 players
Associação Naval 1º de Maio players
U.D. Oliveirense players